Walt Disney Studios Park is a theme park at Disneyland Paris in Marne-la-Vallée, near Paris, France. These are the attractions found in the Walt Disney Studios Park.

Front Lot

Current attractions and entertainment
 Earffel Tower
 Disney Studio 1

Toon Studio

Current attractions and entertainment
 Animation Celebration
 Animation Academy
 Flying Carpets Over Agrabah
 Mickey and the Magician (seasonal)

Former attractions and entertainment
 Animagique
 Art of Disney Animation

Worlds of Pixar

Current attractions and entertainment
 Cars Quatre Roues Rallye (Cars Race Rally)
 Cars Road Trip
 Crush's Coaster
 Monsters, Inc. Scream Academy
 Ratatouille: L'Aventure Totalement Toquée de Rémy
 RC Racer
 Slinky Dog Zigzag Spin
 Toy Soldiers Parachute Drop

Production Courtyard

Current attractions and entertainment
 Studio D
 Disney Junior Dream Factory 
 Stitch Live!
 The Twilight Zone Tower of Terror – A New Dimension of Chills
 Studio Theatre

Former attractions and entertainment
 CinéMagique
 Walt Disney Television Studios
 Disney Junior – Live on Stage!
 Studio Tram Tour: Behind the Magic

Avengers Campus

Current attractions and entertainment
 Avengers Assemble: Flight Force
 Spider-Man W.E.B. Adventure
 "Mission Control" Heroic Encounter Facility

Kingdom of Arendelle - Under Construction
 Frozen Ever After - Not officially confirmed but highly rumoured, with site plans matching the layout of the ride's extant copy in Epcot.

Former sections

Backlot
 Moteurs... Action! Stunt Show Spectacular (Motors... Action! Extreme Stunt Show)
 Armageddon – Les Effets Speciaux (Armageddon Special Effects)
 Rock 'n' Roller Coaster Avec Aerosmith (Rock 'n' Roller Coaster With Aerosmith)

Parades
 Disney Stars 'n' Cars (April 4, 2009 - July 3, 2014)
  Disney Cinema Parade (March 16, 2002 - April 3, 2009)

See also
 Disneyland Park (Paris)
 Disney's Hollywood Studios
 List of Disney's Hollywood Studios attractions

References

Walt Disney Studios Park
Walt Disney Studios Park
Walt Disney Studios Park